Tórsvøllur is a football stadium on the sport site of Gundadalur in Tórshavn, the capital of the Faroe Islands. The stadium holds 5,000 people, and was built in 1999 to become the country's national stadium to provide an artificial grass surface on which international football matches could be played. Previously, the Faroe Islands national team played its home matches in the town of Toftir at Svangaskarð stadium.

In August 2011, floodlights were introduced; these were first officially used for the football match between Faroe Islands and Italy on 2 September 2011.

References

External links 

 
 Tórsvøllur at Nordic Stadiums
 Tórsvøllur at World Stadiums
 The venue at StadiumDB.com

Football venues in the Faroe Islands
Faroe Islands
Sports venues completed in 1999
1999 establishments in the Faroe Islands